Grimston was a railway station serving  Saxelbye village in the English county of Leicestershire. It was opened on the Nottingham direct line of the Midland Railway between London and Nottingham via Corby.The station was formerly named Saxelbye, the name was changed after only 3 months to avoid confusion with Saxby, a few miles east of Melton Mowbray, on the Midland's other line between Leicester and Peterborough. The village of Grimston lies about one mile to the north west of the former Grimston station. The line still exists today as the Old Dalby Test Track.

History 
The station was opened for goods (1 November 1879)  & passengers (2 February 1880)  by the Midland Railway. The station was designed by the Midland Railway company architect John Holloway Sanders.

The line was built to allow the railway company's expresses between London and the North to avoid reversal at Nottingham. It also improved access to and from the iron-ore fields in Leicestershire and Rutland. Local traffic was minimal and Grimston closed to passengers in 1957.

According to the Official Handbook of Stations the following classes of traffic were handled by this station in 1956: G, P, F, L, H, C and there was a 1-ton 10 cwt crane.

Stationmasters
From 1930 the role of stationmaster was merged with that at Old Dalby.

George Hull 1879 - 1881
Charles Radcliffe Cooper 1881 - 1888 (formerly station master at Croxall)
Thomas England 1888 - 1899
Alfred Ballard 1899 - 1906 (afterwards station master at Old Dalby)
Herbert Henry Gilbert 1906 - 1922
William Henry Lambert 1922 - 1924 (Died when hit by a train)
Percy Harry Hyde 1925 - 1939 (also station master at Old Dalby from 1930, afterwards station master at Tewkesbury)

Present day 
The original station building was timber and did not survive, nor did the brick-built goods shed but the Up platform is still in existence and the former station master's house is now a private residence.

References

External links
 A few photos of Grimston station over the years
 A few photos of trains at Grimston station over the years
 Grimston station on navigable 1946 O.S. map

Disused railway stations in Leicestershire
Railway stations in Great Britain opened in 1880
Railway stations in Great Britain closed in 1957
Former Midland Railway stations
John Holloway Sanders railway stations